Lembena, also known as Lembena Pii, Nanimba Pii, Uyalipa Pii, or Wapi Pii, is an Engan language spoken in Papua New Guinea.

Phonology 
Lembena has five vowels: /a, e, i, o, u/.

The sequence /di/ becomes a voiced prenasalized postalveolar affricate /ⁿd͡ʒ/ when followed by a vowel other than /i/.

Notes

References 

 

Engan languages
Languages of East Sepik Province